Squamish (Sḵwx̱wú7mesh sníchim: Sḵwx̱wú7mesh, ; 2016 census population 19,512) is a community and a district municipality in the Canadian province of British Columbia, located at the north end of Howe Sound on the Sea to Sky Highway. The population of the Squamish census agglomeration, which includes First Nation reserves of the Squamish Nation although they are not governed by the municipality, is 19,893.

Indigenous Squamish people have lived in the area for thousands of years. The town of Squamish had its beginning during the construction of the Pacific Great Eastern Railway in the 1910s. It was the first southern terminus of that railway (now a part of CN). The town remains important in the operations of the line and also the port. Forestry has traditionally been the main industry in the area, and the town's largest employer was the pulp mill operated by Western Forest Products. However, Western's operations in Squamish permanently ceased on January 26, 2006. Before the pulp mill, the town's largest employer had been International Forest Products (Interfor) with its sawmill and logging operation, but it closed a few years prior to the pulp mill's closing. In recent years, Squamish has become popular with Vancouver and Whistler residents escaping the increased cost of living in those places, both less than one hour away by highway. Tourism is increasingly important in the town's economy, with an emphasis on outdoor recreation.

Squamish people 

The Squamish people are an indigenous people whose homeland includes the present day area of Squamish, British Columbia. Oral stories and archaeological evidence show that they have lived there for thousands of years.  They have inhabited an area of southwestern British Columbia that includes North and West Vancouver, Howe Sound, Whistler, the areas surrounding the tributaries entering Howe Sound, Burrard Inlet, and English Bay.  The word Squamish derives from the name of the people which in their language is Sḵwx̱wú7mesh.  The people reside primarily on a number of Indian Reserves owned and managed by the Squamish Nation in the Squamish Valley area. A few places and names in the Squamish area derive from Squamish language words and names. Ch’iyáḵmesh is the name of an old village that was located on the Cheakamus River. St’á7mes is a community located near the south entrance to the town of Squamish, which lies below the Stawamus Chief, which gets its name from that village.  Mámx̱wem is where the Mamquam River name comes from as well.

Squamish territory comprises 6,732 km², though lands controlled by the Squamish Nation band government are relatively scarce, and on Indian reserves only, though the Squamish Nation must be, like other native governments, consulted on developments within their people's territory.  Residents of Indian Reserves are not governed by the District of Squamish but by the Squamish Nation.  The Squamish Nation's population and Indian Reserves also include villages in North Vancouver and a number of other reserves at Gibsons and elsewhere in the general region.

The name Keh Kait was the traditional name for the site of downtown Squamish.

Activities

Squamish is known for mountain biking, hiking, climbing, and more

Attractions include the Stawamus Chief, a huge cliff-faced granite massif favoured by rock climbers.  As well as over 300 climbing routes on the Chief proper, a majority of which require traditional climbing protection, there are steep hiking trails around the back to access the three peaks that make up the massif, all giving views of Howe Sound and the surrounding Coast Mountains.  In all, between Shannon Falls, Murrin Park, The Malamute, and the Smoke Bluffs, there are over 1500 rock-climbing routes in the Squamish area (and another 300 or so climbs north of Squamish on the road to Whistler). In recent years, Squamish has also become a major destination for bouldering, with over 2500 problems described in the local guidebook.

Kiteboarding and windsurfing are popular water sports in Squamish during the summer.  Predictable wind on warm sunny days makes the Squamish Spit a top kiteboarding location in western Canada.

Squamish's extensive quality trail system is a key feature of an annual 50-mile ultra trail run, the Squamish 50. Solo runners and relay teams run on many of the same trails as the Test of Metal, and pass through Alice Lake Provincial Park and the campus of Quest University. "The Double" is an award offered annually to the participant with the fastest combined time for both the Test of Metal and Arc'teryx Squamish 50.

Other tourist attractions in Squamish include Shannon Falls waterfall; river-rafting on the Elaho and Squamish rivers; snowmobiling on nearby Brohm Ridge; and bald eagle viewing in the community of Brackendale, which has one of North America's largest populations of bald eagles. Squamish is also a popular destination among Greater Vancouver hikers, mountaineers and backcountry skiers, who visit the large provincial parks in the surrounding Coast Mountains.

Politics
The current mayor of Squamish is Armand Hurford, who won the 2022 election, after having served as a council member. Previous mayors have included Karen Elliot (2018-2022) Patricia Heintzman (2014-2018); Rob Kirkham (2011-2014); Greg Gardner (2008-2011); Ian Sutherland (2002–2008) among others. Current council members are Lauren Greenlaw, Eric Andersen, John French, Andrew Hamilton, Chris Pettingill, and Jenna Stoner. The municipality is part of the Squamish-Lillooet Regional District.

On the provincial level, Squamish is in the West Vancouver-Sea to Sky electoral district. The MLA is Jordan Sturdy (BC Liberal). He was elected in the 2013 provincial election after his predecessor, Joan McIntyre, also of the British Columbia Liberal Party, retired from politics. Sturdy was the sitting mayor of the town of Pemberton at the time of his election to the British Columbia Legislature. He was re-elected in the 2017 provincial election and appointed the critic for Transportation and Infrastructure.

Federally, Squamish is a part of the West Vancouver—Sunshine Coast—Sea to Sky Country electoral district. It is represented by Patrick Weiler of the Liberal Party of Canada, who took office after the 2019 Canadian federal election.

Education

Squamish has five English language public elementary schools: Brackendale Elementary, Garibaldi Highlands Elementary, Mamquam Elementary, Squamish Elementary, and Valleycliffe Elementary. 
Under the Sea to Sky Learning Connections, the public schools district also manages Sea to Sky Online, Sea to Sky Alternative, Cultural Journeys, and Learning Expeditions.  The Conseil scolaire francophone de la Colombie-Britannique operates one Francophone primary school in that city: the école Les Aiglons. There are two public secondary schools – Howe Sound Secondary School and Don Ross Middle School – as well as the board office for School District 48 Howe Sound.

Squamish hosts three private schools: Squamish Montessori Elementary School, Cedar Valley Waldorf School, and Coast Mountain Academy for grades 7 through 12.  Coast Mountain Academy is located in the campus of Quest University.

Capilano University offers post-secondary education through its Squamish campus, including diploma programs and university transfer courses. Quest University, which opened in September 2007, is Canada's first private, non-profit, secular university, though only has an enrolment of less than 5000 students.

Society and culture
Squamish is home to a variety of faiths.  There are eleven churches and religious organizations, including several Christian denominations, as well as the Baháʼí Faith, and a Sikh temple.

The Squamish Public Library is located in the downtown area on Second Avenue.  The library houses a collection of books, CDs, DVDs, and magazines.  It has an Art for Loan collection and an online historical archive of various photographs, periodicals, and other items. Nearby museums include the Britannia Mine Museum and the West Coast Railway Association.

In 1998, Squamish was briefly the home of the world's first unionized McDonald's franchise, although the union was decertified by the summer of 1999.

Every year, Squamish hosts the popular Squamish Valley Music Festival, though they did not proceed with the festival in 2016. Usually taking place in August, the festival has hosted artists such as Eminem, Bruno Mars, Macklemore and Arcade Fire.

In media
Squamish has been a filming location for a number of media works and is a very popular place to film movies and TV shows. Examples include the films Free Willy 3: The Rescue (1997), Insomnia (2002), Before I Fall (2015), Walking Tall (2004), Chaos Theory (2008), The Twilight Saga: Breaking Dawn - Part 1 (2011), The 12 Disasters of Christmas (2012), Star Trek Beyond (2016), Woody Woodpecker (2018), the television series Men in Trees, The Guard, A&E's U.S. adaptation of The Returned, the Hallmark Channel's Aurora Teagarden mysteries, and Netflix's Lost in Space reboot. Sneaky Sasquatch, an Apple Arcade game, is also based there.

Demographics

Ethnicity

Religion 
According to the 2021 census, religious groups in Squamish included:
Irreligion (16,500 persons or 70.1%)
Christianity (5,110 persons or 21.7%)
Sikhism (1,260 persons or 5.4%)
Islam (160 persons or 0.7%)
Hinduism (90 persons or 0.4%)
Judaism (70 persons or 0.3%)
Buddhism (60 persons or 0.3%)
Indigenous Spirituality (40 persons or 0.2%)

Climate

Squamish has an oceanic climate (Cfb) with warm summers and moderately cold winters.

Industry
Carbon Engineering, a company focusing on the commercialization of direct air capture technology, is headquartered in Squamish.

Transit
Public transportation is provided by the Squamish Transit System; this service is free over the summer to students at school age (elementary and secondary).

Daily bus service to Vancouver and YVR Vancouver Airport is provided by YVR Skylynx with multiple departures every day.

Neighbourhoods
Neighbourhoods of Squamish include:
 Brackendale
 Valleycliff
 Downtown Squamish
 Dentville
 Northyards
 Garibaldi Highlands
 Garibaldi Estates

Nearby localities
Cheekye
Paradise Valley

Notable people 
 Sarah Burke, freestyle skier; resided in Squamish;
Ian Campbell,  Indigenous Canadian politician; one of the Hereditary Chiefs of Squamish Nation; 
 Mike Carney, realtor; a former ski racer who had been a member of the Canadian Olympic downhill ski team;
 Daniel Cudmore, actor who starred in the X-Men film series, and The Twilight Saga film series
 Joe Eppele, football player; drafted by Toronto Argonauts in 2010 as an offensive linesman;
 Grimes, musician;  lived in Squamish while recording her fourth studio album, Art Angels;
Xwalacktun (Rick Harry), Squamish Nation artist
 Maëlle Ricker, Olympian; Canadian Olympic gold medalist at the 2010 Vancouver Winter Games in the Snowboard Cross
 Mike Sweeney, soccer player; competed in the 1984 Summer Olympics with Team Canada;
Mikayla Martin, 2018 Ski Cross Junior World Champion;
Squamish Five, an anarchist urban guerrilla group who lived and were arrested in the area
Marc-André Leclerc, rock climber and alpinist. Known for his solo ascents of numerous mountains in several parts of the world.

Sister cities 
Squamish has a sister city arrangement with the following city:
 Shimizu, Shizuoka, Japan

Freedom of the City
The following people and military units have received the Freedom of the City of Squamish.

Individuals
 Lois Wynne: 3 July 2018.

Notes

References

External links

 
District municipalities in British Columbia
Populated places on the British Columbia Coast
Climbing areas of British Columbia